The Roman Catholic Diocese of Clogher was formed in 1111 at the Synod of Rathbreasail as the see for the Kingdom of Uí Chremthainn. It is part of the Province of Armagh.

The original cathedral was in the village of Clogher in County Tyrone, site of a monastery founded in 454 by St. Macartan, who was appointed bishop by St. Patrick in the 5th century. Following the Reformation, Henry VIII confiscated Clogher Cathedral for his Church of Ireland and the Roman Catholic diocese was without a permanent see until 1851 when a decision was made to move to the larger town of Monaghan, 32 kilometres south east of Clogher village. The foundation stone of a St Macartan's Cathedral was laid in Monaghan in June 1861. The cathedral was dedicated in August 1892.

Today the diocese has a faithful of over 100,000 parishioners spread across 37 parishes. The current bishop is the Most Reverend Lawrence Duffy, who was appointed by the Holy See on 8 December 2018 and ordained bishop on 10 February 2019.

Geography
The Diocese straddles the Irish border, consisting of County Monaghan, much of County Fermanagh and parts of Counties Tyrone and Donegal. The main towns are Clones, Enniskillen and Monaghan.

Domnach Airgid

The shrine of the diocese, known as the Domnach Airgid originally housed a copy of the Gospels and the Cross of the Clogher Diocese. According to tradition, these were originally given to St. Macartan by St. Patrick, although the manuscript as it exists today dates from the eighth century. Today these relics of ecclesiastical art held are at the National Museum of Ireland in Dublin.

Principal Saints of the Diocese
 St Macartan of Clogher
 St Tiarnach of Clones
 St Molaise of Devenish
 St Davóg of Lough Derg
 St Davnet of Sliabh Beagh
 St Maoldoid of Muckno
 St Fanchea of Rossory

Parishes of the Diocese

Sexual abuse
In 2011 London-based law firm Jeff Anderson-Ann Olivarius Law (now AO Advocates) said they were to take action in Minnesota against a retired priest from the Clogher diocese who was moved to the US in the 1980s. Also in 2011 a Nevada clerical abuse survivor sued the diocese, claiming that Father Francis Markey, who had been suspended three times by the diocese of Clogher between the years 1964 and 1974 due to allegations of sexually abusing children. According to the lawsuit he was sent for treatment each time and then reinstated into the priesthood, before eventually being moved to Nevada. In that same year the Sunday Business Post newspaper reported that the Bishop, Joseph Duffy, had admitted both to failing to pass abuse claims to police in 1989, and to being party to victims and families being made to sign oaths of non-disclosure. A separate case in the 1970s and 1980s involved Bishop Duffy's uncle, Canon Peter Joe Duffy, who abused at least three victims. The abuse came to light in 2013 and the diocese paid compensation. Other priests of the diocese involved in abuse of children include Fr. Eugene Lewis (jailed for four years on eleven counts of indecent assault); Fr. John McCabe (20 months imprisonment on abuse charges) and Fr Jeremiah McGrath, described by the Belfast Telegraph as "the very antithesis of what a priest should be. A lying, manipulative facilitator for a vicious paedophile": jailed for five years in 2007 for indecently assaulting a 12-year-old girl and facilitating another person to rape her whilst working in North West England after spending time in the diocese of Clogher.

In 2013 a report from the Church's own investigatory body reported a total of 45 allegations against 13 priests in the diocese between 1975 and 2012, and identified unsatisfactory responses to complaints, failure to address risky behaviour and the missing of preventative opportunities. Retired bishop Joseph Duffy accepted the criticism. However, the Report did acknowledge that current procedures for dealing with allegations of abuse in the diocese had improved significantly and it praised Bishop MacDaid's approach to the issue.

Ordinaries

The following is a list of the ten most recent appointments.
 Edward Kernan (1824–1844)
 Charles McNally (1844–1864)
 James Donnelly (1864–1893)
 Richard Owens (1894–1909)
 Patrick McKenna (1909–1942)
 Eugene O'Callaghan (1943–1969)
 Patrick Mulligan (1969–1979)
 Joseph Duffy (1979–2010)
 Liam MacDaid (2010–2016)
 Lawrence Duffy (2018– )

See also
Roman Catholicism in Ireland
List of Roman Catholic dioceses in Northern Ireland
Apostolic Nuncio to Ireland

References

Bibliography

External links
Official website for the diocese
Information of Monaghan County
Catholic-Hierarchy.org – Diocese Profile 

 
Clogher
454 establishments
Dioceses established in the 5th century
5th-century establishments in Ireland
Religion in County Cavan
Religion in County Donegal
Religion in County Fermanagh
Religion in County Louth
Religion in County Monaghan
Religion in County Tyrone
Roman Catholic Ecclesiastical Province of Armagh